Dwayne Perkins (born March 21, 1971) is an American stand-up comedian from Brooklyn, New York, currently residing in Los Angeles. He has made appearances on Conan, Comedy Central, and as a regular correspondent on The Jay Leno Show. In August 2012, he was selected by Rolling Stone magazine as one of their "Five Comics to Watch". In October 2015, he was the artist-in-residence at the Rotterdam International Comedy Festival.

Stage
After emceeing events in college, Perkins began performing at the Uptown Comedy Club in Harlem. After graduation, he moved to Boston in 1994. While performing at The Comedy Studio in Boston in 1999, he was scouted by Late Night with Conan O'Brien, and he made his television stand-up comedy debut on that show in July of the same year. During this period, he also appeared in the New Faces of Comedy showcase at the Just for Laughs festival in Montreal.

In 2003, Perkins moved to Los Angeles. He has indicated that his primary clubs in the area are The Comedy & Magic Club and the Laugh Factory. Other notable area clubs where he has performed include the Hollywood Improv, The Comedy Store, and The Ice House. Notable clubs outside Los Angeles where he has headlined include Gotham City Comedy Club in New York City and the Punch Line in San Francisco.

In addition to performing in the United States and Canada, Perkins has also performed in Europe, the United Kingdom, South Africa, India, the United Arab Emirates, Hong Kong, Singapore, and China.

Comedy style

Perkins has indicated that he prefers to appeal to broad audiences rather than to narrowly defined audience segments. His earliest stage time was in front of predominantly black audiences in Harlem, followed by a period in which he played to predominantly white audiences in Boston, and he credits both experiences with influencing his style. He has also indicated that he prefers subtler material over more confrontational approaches. While he includes material about race in his act, he has indicated that it is not the central focus of his material. His delivery style has been characterized as "likeable" and "matter-of-fact."

Television

References

External links
 
 
 Dwayne Perkins "Off the Top" podcast

1971 births
Living people
American stand-up comedians
American male comedians
African-American stand-up comedians
African-American male comedians
20th-century American comedians
21st-century American comedians
Comedians from New York City
20th-century African-American people
21st-century African-American people